Ilanlu (also Romanized as Īlānlū) is a village in Gejlarat-e Sharqi Rural District, Aras District, Poldasht County, West Azerbaijan Province, Iran. At the 2006 census, its population was 414, in 85 families.

References 

Populated places in Poldasht County